The 1995–96 Los Angeles Kings season, was the Kings' 29th season in the National Hockey League. It involved Wayne Gretzky being traded to the St. Louis Blues. For the third consecutive year, the Kings failed to make the playoffs.

Offseason

Regular season
February 27, 1996: Wayne Gretzky was traded from the Los Angeles Kings to the St. Louis Blues for Patrice Tardif, Craig Johnson, Roman Vopat, 1st round pick in the 1997 draft and a 5th round pick in the 1996 draft.

Final standings

Schedule and results

Player statistics

Regular season
Scoring

Goaltending

Awards and honors

Transactions
The Kings were involved in the following transactions during the 1995–96 season.

Trades

Free agent signings

Free agents lost

Waivers

Draft picks
Los Angeles's draft picks at the 1995 NHL Entry Draft held at the Edmonton Coliseum in Edmonton, Alberta.

References
 Kings on Hockey Database

Los Angeles Kings seasons
Los Angeles Kings season, 1995-96
Los
LA Kings
LA Kings